Vladimír Perexta (born 13 January 1990) is a professional Slovak football player who is currently playing for the Slovak Corgoň League club MŠK Žilina.

Career
Born in Michalovce. He started his career by playing in the youth teams of MFK Zemplín Michalovce.
On 24 November 2013, Perexta made his first team debut against ŠK Slovan Bratislava in the 2013–14 Corgoň Liga.

External links

Eurofotbal profile
Corgoň Liga profile

References

1990 births
Living people
Slovak footballers
Association football midfielders
MŠK Žilina players
MŠK Rimavská Sobota players
Slovak Super Liga players
People from Michalovce
Sportspeople from the Košice Region